Young Martha is a collaborative extended play by American rapper Young Thug and producer Carnage. The EP was released on September 22, 2017, by YSL, 300 Entertainment, Atlantic Records and Heavyweight Records. Young Martha includes four tracks and guest appearances from Meek Mill and Shakka. It was produced by Carnage alongside OG Parker, Felix Snow, Wheezy, Nic Nac and Senojnayr.

Background
The collaborative EP was initially announced by Carnage in December 2016. The final track of the project, "Don't Call Me", premiered in July 2016, and was expected to be included on Carnage's sophomore album.

Singles
The lead single, "Homie" featuring Meek Mill, was released on September 8, 2017, for streaming and digital download. It was accompanied by a music video which premiered on Young Thug's YouTube. The second single, "Liger", was revealed a day before the EP's release on September 21, 2017.

Track listing
Credits adapted from BMI.

Notes
  signifies a co-producer

References

Young Thug albums
2017 EPs